Archoleptoneta gertschi is a species of spider. It is known in a small area of California.

The species was named after Willis J. Gertsch who described many species of North American arachnids.

References 

Araneomorphae
Spiders of the United States
Endemic fauna of California
Spiders described in 2010
Fauna without expected TNC conservation status